USCGC Chase (WMSM-916) is the second  of the United States Coast Guard (USCG).

Development and design 

They are tasked to go against lightly armed hostiles in low-threat environments.

In February 2014, the USCG announced that Bollinger Shipyards, Eastern Shipbuilding, and General Dynamics Bath Iron Works had been awarded design contracts for the OPC. The Government Accountability Office denied contract appeals by VT Halter Marine and Ingalls Shipbuilding.

In September 2016, Eastern Shipbuilding of Panama City, Florida, was awarded a $110.3 million contract to build the first Offshore Patrol Cutter with an option to purchase eight additional cutters.  On October 15, 2016 the Coast Guard issued a notice to proceed with the detailed design of the Offshore Patrol Cutter to Eastern Shipbuilding.

Construction and career 
Chases first steel cutting started on 27 April 2020. She is scheduled to laid down in 2021 and be completed by 2023.

See also 
 Integrated Deepwater System Program

References 

Heritage-class cutters
Ships of the United States Coast Guard